Mchenga cyclicos is a species of fish in the family Cichlidae. It is endemic to Lake Malawi, where it has been collected near the Nankumba Peninsula of Malawi. Its natural habitat is freshwater lakes.

References

cyclicos
Fish of Malawi
Fish of Lake Malawi
Fish described in 1993
Taxonomy articles created by Polbot